Wheelchair racing at the 2004 Summer Olympics featured as a demonstration event within the athletics programme at the Athens Olympic Stadium on 22 August 2004. There were two events: an 800 m race for women and a 1500 m race for men. Medals were not awarded, as the sport was not part of the official competition.

Men's 1500 m wheelchair

Women's 800 m wheelchair

See also
 Athletics at the 2004 Summer Paralympics

. Technological Advancements in Wheelchair Manufacturing.
Athletics at the 2004 Athens Summer Games: Men's 1,500 metres Wheelchair. Sports Reference. Retrieved on 2014-05-11.
Athletics at the 2004 Athens Summer Games: Women's 800 metres Wheelchair. Sports Reference. Retrieved on 2014-05-11.

Wheelchair racing
2004